In mathematics, a measure algebra is a Boolean algebra with a countably additive positive measure. A probability measure on a measure space gives a measure algebra on the Boolean algebra of measurable sets modulo null sets.

Definition
A measure algebra is a Boolean algebra B with a measure m, which is a real-valued function on B such that:
m(0)=0, m(1)=1
m(x) >0 if x≠0
m is countably additive: m(Σxi) = Σm(xi) if the xi are a countable set of elements that are disjoint (xi ∧ xj=0 whenever i≠j).

References

Measure theory